Nicolas Nyengerai (born 1961) is a Zimbabwean long-distance runner who specialized in the marathon.

He participated at the 1987 and 1995 World Cross Country Championships. His marathon wins came at the 1992 Belgrade Marathon, the 1995 Zwolle Marathon and the 1995 All-Africa Games.

His personal best time was 2:15:38 hours, achieved in November 1998 at Zanzibar.

References

1961 births
Living people
Zimbabwean male marathon runners
Athletes (track and field) at the 1995 All-Africa Games
African Games gold medalists for Zimbabwe
African Games medalists in athletics (track and field)